Five ships of the United States Navy have been or will be named USS Pittsburgh in honor of Pittsburgh, Pennsylvania:

  (alternately spelled Pittsburg as was CA-4) was an ironclad gunboat that served during the American Civil War.
 , originally named USS Pennsylvania (ACR-4), was an armored cruiser serving during World War I.
 , originally named Albany, was a  that served during World War II.
  was a  decommissioned in 2019.
  is a proposed , whose name was announced in January 2021.

References

United States Navy ship names